Selim Abdel Khalek (born 24 July 1993) is an Egyptian professional footballer who plays for Pharco FC as a right back.

In 2017, Pyramids FC signed Abdel Khalekfor a 3-year contract for 350,000 Egyptian Pounds from Aswan.

References

External links 
 Selim Abdel-Khalik at KOOORA.com
 Selim Abdel Khalek at Footballdatabase

1993 births
Living people
Egyptian footballers
Egyptian Premier League players
Association football defenders
Aswan SC players
Nogoom FC players
Pyramids FC players
People from Sharqia Governorate